Laymon Samuel Yokely (May 30, 1906 – November 26, 1975) was an American baseball pitcher in the Negro leagues. He played college baseball while attending Livingstone College in Salisbury, North Carolina and played professionally from 1926 to 1946 with several teams.

References

External links
 and Baseball-Reference Black Baseball stats and Seamheads
Laymon Yokely at Negro Leagues Baseball Museum

1906 births
1975 deaths
Baltimore Black Sox players
Baltimore Elite Giants players
Bacharach Giants players
Philadelphia Stars players
Washington Black Senators players
Baseball players from North Carolina
Livingstone Blue Bears baseball players
Baseball pitchers
20th-century African-American sportspeople